For the 1967 Vuelta a España, the field consisted of 110 riders; 73 finished the race.

By rider

By nationality

References

1967 Vuelta a España
1967